Bowler is an unincorporated community in Appomattox County, Virginia, United States.

References
GNIS reference

Unincorporated communities in Virginia
Unincorporated communities in Appomattox County, Virginia